Reuel Anson Lochore (1903 – 1991) was a New Zealand public servant, diplomat, scholar, and philologist.

Biography
Lochore was the son of a Methodist minister and a teacher of the deaf. He studied English, French, Latin, philosophy and psychology at Auckland University College and also taught at a college in Wellington. From his adolescence, Lochore admired the German language and culture.

In 1930, Lochore moved to Germany where he became a university student. He studied at the Institute for Foreigners in Berlin and later pursued a PhD in Romance languages and literature at the University of Bonn. During his time in Germany, Lochore witnessed the rise of the Nazi Party. During the Interwar period, he sought to promote friendly relations between New Zealand and Germany. He attempted to promote a trade agreement between the two countries but this initiative failed due to vocal trade union opposition in New Zealand and a lack of public interest in trade with Germany. In 1938, Lochore defended a controversial visit to New Zealand by Felix von Luckner, a German commercial raider who had targeted Allied shipping in the South Pacific during World War I.

During World War II, Lochore worked as the director for language services at the Department of Internal Affairs and was given the job of screening immigrants to New Zealand including Jewish refugees fleeing Nazi-occupied Europe. According to Freya Klier, Lochore's anti-Communism stemmed from an experience of being beaten up by a group of German Communists in 1930.

Owing to his connections to the first National Party Prime Minister Sidney Holland, Lochore worked at various diplomatic postings in Asia including Malaya and Indonesia. In 1950, he published a book called From Europe to New Zealand, which became a guide for helping the Government to screen non-British migrants. While Lochore favoured importing Scandinavian and Dutch immigrants to supplement British and Irish immigrants, he discouraged Italian, Greek, Yugoslavian, Jewish, and Asian immigration to New Zealand. He was also opposed to settlement by Eurasians from the former Netherlands East Indies (modern-day Indonesia).

In 1959, Lochore was appointed as the first secretary to Charles Bennett, the New Zealand high commissioner to Malaya and one of the first Māori officials at the New Zealand Department of External Affairs. Between 1964 and 1966, Lochore also served as the New Zealand minister to Indonesia. During his time in Indonesia, he witnessed the 30 September coup attempt and the rise of Suharto's New Order. In 1966, Lochore was appointed as New Zealand's first ambassador to West Germany.

In 1980, Lochore alleged during a Parliamentary committee that at least 15 Soviet agents had operated in several government departments including the Ministries of Foreign Affairs, Trade and Industry, Defence, Justice and Health.

References

Further reading

 Lochore, R.A. "Culture-Historical Aspects of the Malayo-Polynesian Settlement in Ancient South-East Asia." Hocken Lecture 1973. Dunedin, New Zealand: Hocken Library, University of Otago, 1974.

1903 births
1991 deaths
New Zealand anti-communists
New Zealand public servants
Ambassadors of New Zealand to Germany
Ambassadors of New Zealand to Indonesia
University of Auckland alumni
University of Bonn alumni